The .22 Savage Hi-Power cartridge, also known as 5.6×52mmR, was created by Charles Newton and introduced by Savage Arms in 1912. It was designed to be used in the Savage Model 99 hammerless lever action rifle. It is based upon the .25-35 Winchester cartridge necked down to accept a .227in/.228in diameter bullet. Its original loading was a 70 grain soft point bullet with a velocity of about 2790 feet per second.

History and description

The .22 Savage Hi-Power's relatively high velocity for the time and "shocking" power led to an initial surge of popularity, and was attributed with almost magical killing powers even on large and dangerous soft-skinned game such as tigers. Missionary H. R. Caldwell used his .22 Savage Hi-Power on a 400 pound tiger in China with success, something the Savage rifle company exploited in its advertising for the cartridge in the early days. The famous elephant-hunter W. D. M. Bell used a .22 Savage Hi-Power to kill forest buffalo in West Africa in the 1920s, and reported in his magazine articles that the cartridge was popular at that time for red deer stalking in Scotland. While it was used in the UK on deer as large as Red Stags, it fell out of favour as a big game cartridge after being superseded by other cartridge developments such as the .250-3000. As time went on, other .22 centerfire cartridges outstripped it in performance such as the .220 Swift, and with the advent of the .223 Remington in the 1960s, the cartridge was considered obsolete. Today it is regarded as a vintage round, and aficionados use it for small game hunting in similar applications as the .223 Remington, though it is used for deer hunting where it is legal to do so. In Europe the cartridge is still chambered in drillings and similar combination guns, and the cartridge is still used by hunters for smaller European deer species such as Roe deer.

Although the .22 Savage Hi-Power is no longer made in the United States, it is still produced by several European makers. In Europe, the .22 Savage Hi-Power is called the "5.6×52mmR", and is still made by RWS, Norma, Sellier & Bellot, and Prvi Partisan.

Notes

External links
 The 5.6x52R (.22 Savage High-Power)

Pistol and rifle cartridges
Rimmed cartridges
Savage Arms